Tewkesbury is a constituency represented in the House of Commons of the UK Parliament since its 1997 recreation by Laurence Robertson, a Conservative.

History

1610 to 1918
Tewkesbury existed in this period, first in the parliamentary borough form. It returned two MPs until this was reduced to one in 1868, then saw itself become instead a larger county division under the Redistribution of Seats Act 1885, and it was abolished in 1918.

Prominent politicians
William Dowdeswell was Chancellor of the Exchequer for two years under Rockingham, and his short tenure of this position appears to have been a successful one, he being in Lecky's words a good financier, but nothing more.  To general astonishment, he refused to abandon his friends and to take an office under The 1st Earl of Chatham ("Pitt the Elder"), who succeeded Rockingham in August 1766. Dowdeswell then led the Rockingham party in the House of Commons, taking an active part in debate until his death.  In 1774 he warned MPs against passing the Boston Port Act, related to the later Boston Tea Party.
Charles Hanbury-Tracy was heir to much of the Pontypool part the growing iron industry and served as the chairman of the commission of 1835 that commissioned the new Houses of Parliament and judged designs.
After service for Tewkesbury Frederick Lygon, 6th Earl Beauchamp entered the Lords and then served in Cabinet positions under the earlier governments headed by Lord Salisbury, before the turn-of-the century third government.

1997 to date
The fourth periodic review of Westminster constituencies in 1997 saw the seat's recreation, from the similar, but slightly larger county division Tewkesbury and Cirencester, compared to the present seat.

Boundaries

1885–1918: The Municipal Boroughs of Gloucester and Tewkesbury, the Sessional Divisions of Berkeley, Cheltenham, Gloucester, Tewkesbury, and Winchcombe, part of the Sessional Division of Whitminster, and the parish of Slimbridge.

1997–2010: The Borough of Tewkesbury wards of Ashchurch, Bishop's Cleeve East, Bishop's Cleeve North, Bishop's Cleeve South, Brockworth Glebe, Brockworth Moorfield, Brockworth Westfield, Churchdown Brookfield, Churchdown Parton, Churchdown Pirton, Cleeve Hill, Coombe Hill, Crickley, De Winton, Dumbleton, Gotherington, Horsbere, Innsworth, Shurdington, Tewkesbury Mitton, Tewkesbury Newtown, Tewkesbury Prior's Park, Tewkesbury Town, Twyning, and Winchcombe, and the Borough of Cheltenham wards of Leckhampton with Up Hatherley, Prestbury, and Swindon.

2010–present: The Borough of Tewkesbury wards of Ashchurch with Walton Cardiff, Badgeworth, Brockworth, Churchdown Brookfield, Churchdown St John's, Cleeve Grange, Cleeve Hill, Cleeve St Michael's, Cleeve West, Coombe Hill, Hucclecote, Innsworth with Down Hatherley, Isbourne, Northway, Oxenton Hill, Shurdington, Tewkesbury Newtown, Tewkesbury Prior's Park, Tewkesbury Town with Mitton, Twyning, and Winchcombe, the Borough of Cheltenham wards of Prestbury and Swindon Village, and the City of Gloucester ward of Longlevens.

The constituency was created in 1997 from parts of the seats of Cirencester and Tewkesbury, Cheltenham and West Gloucestershire.

As its name suggests, the main town in the constituency is Tewkesbury, but other settlements include Twyning, Ashchurch, Bishop's Cleeve, Winchcombe, Prestbury, Brockworth, Churchdown, Innsworth and Longlevens.

Constituency profile
The town has a raised centre with the second largest parish church in the country that is the church of a former Benedictine monastery, named Tewkesbury Abbey, the town also has its own mustard and July medieval battle festival.  Workless claimants, registered jobseekers,  were in November 2012 significantly lower than the national average of 3.8%, at 2.2% of the population based on a statistical compilation by The Guardian.

Members of Parliament

MPs 1610–1629
 Constituency created (1610)
The constituency was enfranchised on 23 March 1610 – the first record of its members sworn is 16 April 1610.

MPs 1640–1868

MPs 1868–1918

MPs since 1997

Elections since 1997

Elections in the 2010s

Elections in the 2000s

Election in the 1990s

Election results 1868-1918

Elections in the 1910s 

General election 1914–15:

Another general election was required to take place before the end of 1915. The political parties had been making preparations for an election to take place and by the July 1914, the following candidates had been selected; 
Unionist: Michael Hicks Beach
Liberal: Richard Mathias

Elections in the 1900s

Elections in the 1890s

Elections in the 1880s

Election in the 1870s

Elections in the 1860s

 Seat reduced to one member.

Election results 1832–1868

Elections in the 1860s

 Caused by Dowdeswell's resignation to context the 1866 West Worcestershire by-election.

 

 Caused by Lygon's resignation to stand at the 1864 West Worcestershire by-election.

Elections in the 1850s

 Caused by the appointment of Lygon as a Civil Lord of the Admiralty

Elections in the 1840s

Elections in the 1830s

 Caused by Martin's death

See also
 List of parliamentary constituencies in Gloucestershire

Notes

References

Sources
 Robert Beatson, A Chronological Register of Both Houses of Parliament (London: Longman, Hurst, Res & Orme, 1807) 
 D. Brunton & D. H. Pennington, Members of the Long Parliament (London: George Allen & Unwin, 1954)
 Cobbett's Parliamentary history of England, from the Norman Conquest in 1066 to the year 1803 (London: Thomas Hansard, 1808) 
 The Constitutional Year Book for 1913 (London: National Union of Conservative and Unionist Associations, 1913)
 F. W. S. Craig, British Parliamentary Election Results 1832-1885 (2nd edition, Aldershot: Parliamentary Research Services, 1989)
 J. Holladay Philbin, Parliamentary Representation 1832 - England and Wales (New Haven: Yale University Press, 1965)
 Henry Stooks Smith, The Parliaments of England from 1715 to 1847 (2nd edition, edited by FWS Craig — Chichester: Parliamentary Reference Publications, 1973)
 

Parliamentary constituencies in South West England
Constituencies of the Parliament of the United Kingdom disestablished in 1918
Constituencies of the Parliament of the United Kingdom established in 1997
Politics of Gloucestershire
Constituencies of the Parliament of the United Kingdom established in 1610